The 21st Young Artist Awards ceremony (formerly known as the Youth in Film Awards), presented by the Young Artist Association, honored excellence of young performers under the age of 21 in the fields of film, television and theatre for the year 1999, and took place on March 19, 2000, at the Sportsmen's Lodge in Studio City, California.

The announcer for the evening was William H. Bassett.  The hosts for the evening were Austin O'Brien, Trevor O'Brien, Cody McMains, Michelle Trachtenberg, Kaitlin Cullum and Kimberly Cullum.  Performers for the evening included, Girls On-Q, Adam Nicholson, Adam Wylie and Blake McIver Ewing.

Established in 1978 by long-standing Hollywood Foreign Press Association member, Maureen Dragone, the Young Artist Association was the first organization to establish an awards ceremony specifically set to recognize and award the contributions of performers under the age of 21 in the fields of film, television, theater and music.

Categories
★ Bold indicates the winner in each category.

Best Performance in a Feature Film

Best Performance in a Feature Film: Leading Young Actor
★ Haley Joel Osment - The Sixth Sense - Disney (Buena Vista Pictures)
Lucas Black - Crazy in Alabama - Columbia Pictures
Jeremy Blackman - Magnolia - New Line Cinema
Noah Fleiss - Joe the King - Trimark
Jake Gyllenhaal - October Sky - Universal

Best Performance in a Feature Film: Leading Young Actress
★ Kimberly J. Brown - Tumbleweeds - Fine Line Features
Brittany Murphy - Girl, Interrupted - Columbia Pictures
Natalie Portman	- Anywhere But Here - 20th Century Fox
Christina Ricci - Sleepy Hollow - Paramount
Michelle Williams - Dick - TriStar Pictures

Best Performance in a Feature Film: Supporting Young Actor
★ (tie) Reeve Carney - Snow Falling on Cedars - Universal
★ (tie) Ryan Merriman - The Deep End of the Ocean - Columbia Pictures
Miles Marsico - Stuart Little - Columbia Pictures
Cody McMains - Tumbleweeds - Fine Line Features
Kyle Sabihy - Analyze This - Warner Brothers

Best Performance in a Feature Film: Supporting Young Actress
★ Thora Birch - American Beauty - DreamWorks SKG
Jena Malone - For Love of the Game - Universal
Anna Paquin - A Walk on the Moon - Miramax
Colleen Rennison - The Story of Us - Universal
Michelle Trachtenberg - Inspector Gadget - Disney

Best Performance in a Feature Film: Young Actor Age Ten or Under
★ Jake Lloyd - Star Wars: Episode I – The Phantom Menace - 20th Century Fox
Zachary David Cope - Stir of Echoes - Artisan Entertainment
Jonathan Lipnicki - Stuart Little - Columbia Pictures
Cole and Dylan Sprouse - Big Daddy - Columbia Pictures

Best Performance in a Feature Film: Young Actress Age Ten or Under
★ Scarlett Pomers - Happy, Texas - Miramax
Penny Bae Bridges - True Crime - Warner Brothers
Francesca Fisher-Eastwood - True Crime - Warner Brothers
Alyssajo Norcliffe - Dream Parlor - Timeless Entertainment

Best Performance in an International Film

Best Performance in an International Film: Young Performer
★ Wei Minzhi - Not One Less - China
Joe Breen, Ciaran Owens, Michael Legge - Angela's Ashes - Ireland
Keith Chin - Anna and the King - Malaysia
Lester Llansang - Saranggola (The Kite) - Philippines
Manuel Lozano - Butterfly's Tongue - Spain
Mohsen Ramezani - The Color of Paradise - Iran
Madelief Verelst - Scratches in the Table - Holland

Best Performance in a TV Movie or Pilot

Best Performance in a TV Movie or Pilot: Leading Young Actor
★ Mason Gamble - Anya's Bell - CBS
Jake Dinwiddie - Au Pair - Fox Family Channel
Andrew Ducote - Judgment Day: The Ellie Nesler Story - USA Cable
Jake LeDoux - Summer's End - Showtime
Trevor Morgan - Genius - Disney Channel
Jonathan Tucker - Mr. Music - Disney Channel

Best Performance in a TV Movie or Pilot: Leading Young Actress
★ Jamie Renee Smith - My Last Love - ABC
Kirsten Dunst - The Devil's Arithmetic - Showtime
Alicia Morton - Annie - ABC
Tegan Moss - Sea People - Showtime
Bethany Richards - Hayley Wagner, Star - Showtime
Kirsten Storms - Zenon: Girl of the 21st Century - Disney Channel

Best Performance in a TV Movie or Pilot: Supporting Young Actor
★ Drake Bell - The Jack Bull - HBO
Bill Switzer - Locked in Silence - Showtime
Christopher Bell - Sarah, Plain and Tall: Winter's End - CBS
Brendan Fletcher - Summer's End - Showtime
Miko Hughes - Lethal Vows - CBS
Will Rothhaar - Black and Blue - CBS

Best Performance in a TV Movie or Pilot: Supporting Young Actress
★ Hilary Duff - The Soul Collector - CBS
Amanda Barfield - A Memory in My Heart - CBS
Camilla Belle - Replacing Dad - CBS
Sarah Francis - Summer's End - Showtime
Alison Pill - Artists Specials: Degas and the Dancer - HBO
Emmy Rossum - Genius - Disney Channel

Best Performance in a TV Movie or Pilot: Young Actor Age Ten or Under
★ Marc Donato - Locked in Silence - Showtime
Seth Adkins - The Promise - CBS
Jake Sakson - Don't Look Under the Bed - Disney Channel
Jacob Smith - Evolution's Child - USA
Michal Suchánek - Aftershock: Earthquake in New York - CBS
Hayden Tank - Replacing Dad - CBS

Best Performance in a TV Movie or Pilot: Young Actress Age Ten or Under
★ Brittney Lee Harvey - Mr. Murder - ABC
Courtney Chase - Nick of Time - ABC
Emily Osment - Sarah, Plain and Tall: Winter's End - CBS
Hayden Panettiere - If You Believe - Lifetime
Katie Volding - Smart House - Disney Channel

Best Performance in a Drama Series

Best Performance in a Drama Series: Leading Young Actor
★ Austin O'Brien - Promised Land - CBS
Brandon Gilberstadt - 100 Deeds for Eddie McDowd - Nickelodeon
Arjay Smith - The Journey of Allen Strange - Nickelodeon

Best Performance in a Drama Series: Leading Young Actress
★ Beverley Mitchell - 7th Heaven - Warner Brothers
Majandra Delfino - Roswell - Warner Brothers
Sarah Schaub - Promised Land - CBS

Best Performance in a Drama Series: Supporting Young Actor
★ Dan Byrd - Any Day Now - Lifetime
Cameron Finley - Baywatch - Syndicated
Robert Iler - The Sopranos - HBO
Courtland Mead - NYPD Blue - ABC
Max Peters - Hope Island - PAX
Shane Sweet - The Journey of Allen Strange - Nickelodeon

Best Performance in a Drama Series: Supporting Young Actress
★ Shari Dyon Perry - Any Day Now - Lifetime
Erin J. Dean - The Journey of Allen Strange - Nickelodeon
Heather Matarazzo - Now and Again - CBS
Jamie-Lynn Sigler - The Sopranos - HBO
Julia Whelan - Once and Again - ABC
Evan Rachel Wood - Profiler - NBC

Best Performance in a Drama Series: Young Actor Age Ten and Under
★ Myles Jeffrey - Early Edition - CBS
Bobby Borriello - The Sopranos - HBO
Jeffrey Schoeny - The X-Files - FOX

Best Performance in a Drama Series: Young Actress Age Ten and Under
★ Mae Middleton - Any Day Now - Lifetime
Chea Courtney - Melrose Place - FOX
Brittany Tiplady - Millennium - FOX
Karle Warren - Judging Amy - CBS

Best Performance in a Drama Series: Guest Starring Young Actor
★ Tony C. Barriere - Any Day Now - Lifetime
Carlo Alban - Touched by an Angel - CBS
Bobby Edner - Touched by an Angel - CBS
Chas Smith]- Chicago Hope - CBS
Scott Terra - Charmed - Warner Brothers
Jake Thomas - Touched by an Angel - CBS

Best Performance in a Drama Series: Guest Starring Young Actress
★ Kaitlin Cullum - 7th Heaven - Warner Brothers
Ashley Edner - Party of Five - FOX
Rachel Grate - ER - NBC
Hallee Hirsh - Law and Order - NBC
Aysia Polk - JAG - NBC
Caitlin Wachs - The Pretender - NBC

Best Performance in a Comedy Series

Best Performance in a Comedy Series: Leading Young Actor
★ Thomas Dekker - Honey, I Shrunk the Kids - Syndicated
Robert Ri'chard - Cousin Skeeter - Nickelodeon
Lee Thompson Young - The Famous Jett Jackson - Disney Channel

Best Performance in a Comedy Series: Leading Young Actress
★ Georgina Sherrington - The Worst Witch - HBO
Amanda Bynes - The Amanda Show - Nickelodeon
Mila Kunis - That '70s Show - FOX

Best Performance in a Comedy Series: Supporting Young Actor
★ Andrew Ducote - Thanks - CBS
Ryan Sommers Baum - The Famous Jett Jackson - Disney Channel
Daniel Clark - I Was a Sixth Grade Alien - Fox Family Channel
Dee Jay Daniels - The Hughleys - ABC
Leon Curtis Frierson - All That - Nickelodeon
Eric Lloyd - Jesse - NBC

Best Performance in a Comedy Series: Supporting Young Actress
★ Kerry Duff - The Famous Jett Jackson - Disney Channel
Ashley Lyn Cafagna - Saved by the Bell: The New Class - NBC
Amy Centner - Thanks - CBS
Courtney Peldon - Home Improvement - ABC
Brianne Prather - The Jersey - Disney Channel
Alexa Vega - Ladies Man - CBS
Shawna Waldron - Ladies Man - CBS

Best Performance in a Comedy Series: Young Performer Age Ten or Under
★ Sara Paxton - Working - NBC
Ashley Monique Clark - The Hughleys - ABC
[Rachel David - Movie Stars - Warner Brothers
Ashley & Lindsey Trefger - Home Improvement - ABC

Best Performance in a Comedy Series: Guest Starring Young Performer
★ J.B. Gaynor - Boy Meets World - ABC
Cory Buck - Sports Night - ABC
Alexandra Gilliams - Sabrina, the Teenage Witch - ABC
Rachel Glenn - Cousin Skeeter - Nickelodeon
Matt Weinberg - Friends - NBC
Joey Zimmerman - Cupid - ABC

Best Performance in a Soap Opera

Best Performance in a Soap Opera: Young Actor
★ David Lago - The Young and the Restless - CBS
Joseph Cross - As the World Turns - CBS
Josh Ryan Evans - Passions - CBS
Jesse McCartney - All My Children - ABC
Logan O'Brien - General Hospital - ABC
Nicholas Pappone - The Young and the Restless CBS

Best Performance in a Soap Opera: Young Actress
★ Taylor Anne Mountz - Passions - NBC
Chea Courtney - Passions - NBC
Adrienne Frantz - The Bold and the Beautiful - CBS
Carly Schroeder - Port Charles - CBS
Brittany Snow - Guiding Light - CBS
Erin Torpey - One Life to Live - NBC

Best Performance in a Voice-Over

Best Performance in a Voice-Over (TV or Feature Film): Young Actor
★ Eli Marienthal - The Iron Giant - Warner Brothers
Joseph Ashton - Rocket Power - Nickelodeon
Michael James Caloz - Arthur - KCET
Rickey D'Shon Collins - Recess - ABC
Alex D. Linz - Tarzan - Disney

Best Performance in a Voice-Over (TV or Feature Film): Young Actress
★ Aria Noelle Curzon - Dan Danger - Nickelodeon
Kristin Fairlie - Little Bear - Nickelodeon
Olivia Hack - Hey Arnold! - Nickelodeon
Emily Hart - Sabrina: The Animated Series - UPN
Ashley Johnson - Recess - ABC

Best Ensemble Performance

Best Performance in a Feature Film or TV Movie: Young Ensemble
★ Shiloh 2: Shiloh Season - Warner BrothersZachary Browne, Rachel David, Marissa Leigh, Joe Pichler and Caitlin WachsAnnie - ABC
Erin Adams, Sarah Hyland, Lalaine, Alicia Morton, Nanea Miyata, Marissa Rago and Danelle Wilson
The Artists Specials: Mary Cassatt, an American Impressionist - HBO
Emma Isherwood, Jonathan Koensgen and Charlotte Sullivan
Music of the Heart - Miramax
Michael Angarano, Melay Araya, Henry Dinhoffer, Jean Luke Figueroa, Victoria Gomez, Justin Spaulding, Zoe Sternbach-Taubman and Jade Yorker

Best Performance in a TV Series: Young Ensemble
★ The Jersey - Disney ChannelCourtnee Draper, Michael Galeota, Theo Greenly and Jermaine WilliamsFreaks and Geeks - NBC
John Francis Daley, James Franco, Sarah Hagen, Jarrett Lennon, Samm Levine, Seth Rogen, Jason Segel and Martin Starr
Get Real - FOX
Jesse Eisenberg, Kyle Brent Gibson, Anne Hathaway and Eric Christian Olsen
Little Men - PAX
Trevor Blumas, Alex Campbell, Brittney Irvin, Corey Sevier and Rachel Skarsten
Safe Harbor - WB
Orlando Brown, Christopher Khayman Lee, Jeremy Lelliott, Chyler Lleigh and Jamie Williams
So Weird - Disney Channel
Erik von Detten; Patrick Levis; Cara DeLizia; Eric Lively

Best Family Entertainment
Best Family TV Movie or Pilot: Network
★ Anya's Bell - CBSAnnie - ABC
Behind the Mask - CBS
Dr. Quinn, Medicine Woman: The Movie - CBS
My Last Love - ABC
Sabrina, Down Under - ABC
Secret of Giving - CBS
The Simple Life of Noah Dearborn - CBS

Best Family TV Movie or Pilot: Cable
★ Summer's End - ShowtimeThe Thirteenth Year - Disney Channel
A Lesson Before Dying - HBO
Gift of Love: The Daniel Huffman Story - Showtime
Hayley Wagner, Star - Showtime
Horse Sense - Disney Channel
Sea People - Showtime
The Artist Specials: Mary Cassatt: An American Impressionist - HBO

Best Animated TV Show or Series
★ Sabrina: The Animated Series - ABCAngela Anaconda - Fox Family Channel
Bear in the Big Blue House - Disney Channel
Blue's Clues - Nickelodeon
Mike, Lu & Og - Cartoon Network
Recess - ABC

Best Family TV Drama Series
★ Judging Amy - CBS7th Heaven - Warner Brothers
100 Deeds for Eddie McDowd - Nickelodeon
Hope Island - PAX
Little Men - PAX
So Weird - Disney Channel
Touched by an Angel - CBS

Best Family TV Comedy Series
★ Freaks and Geeks - NBCAnimals Are People Too - PAX
The Famous Jett Jackson - Disney Channel
The Hughleys - ABC
The Jersey - Disney Channel
Kids Say the Darndest Things - CBS

Best Family Feature Film for 1999: Animated
★ Toy Story 2 - DisneyThe Adventures of Elmo in Grouchland - Columbia Pictures
The Iron Giant - Warner Brothers
Pokémon: The First Movie - Warner Brothers
Tarzan - Disney

Best Family Feature Film for 1999: Comedy
★ Stuart Little - Columbia PicturesInspector Gadget - Disney
Muppets from Space - Columbia Pictures
Never Been Kissed - 20th Century Fox
The Other Sister - Touchstone

Best Family Feature Film for 1999: Drama
★ Music of the Heart - MiramaxAnna and the King - 20th Century Fox
For Love of the Game - Universal
October Sky - Universal
Star Wars: Episode I – The Phantom Menace - 20th Century Fox
The Straight Story - Disney

Best International Film
★ Not One Less - ChinaThe Butterfly's Tongue - Spain
The Color of Paradise - Iran
Saranggola (The Kite) - Philippines
Scratches in the Table - Holland

Special awards
Outstanding Young Performer in Theater
★ Roberto Cisneros - The Smuin Ballet, San FranciscoOutstanding Young Performers in a Television Commercial
★ Hallie Kate Eisenberg - Pepsi★ Connor Matheus - K-MartThe Jackie Coogan Award
Outstanding Contribution to Youth Through Motion Pictures
★ George Lucas - Producer, LucasfilmThe Mickey Rooney Award
Former Child Star Life Achievement Award
★ Lucille Bliss - voice of "Anastasia" in Disney's Cinderella (1950)The Michael Landon Award
Community Service to Youth
★ Kids On Stage For A Better World

Young Artist Awards Scholarship
★ R. J. Arnett

References

External links
Official site

Young Artist Awards ceremonies
1999 film awards
1999 television awards
2000 in California
2000 in American cinema
2000 in American television